The 2006 Hertsmere Borough Council election took place on 4 May 2006 to elect members of Hertsmere Borough Council in Hertfordshire, England. One third of the council was up for election and the Conservative Party stayed in overall control of the council.

After the election, the composition of the council was:
Conservative 28
Liberal Democrat 6
Labour 5

Background
Before the election the Conservatives controlled the council with 26 seats, compared to 7 for Labour and 6 Liberal Democrats. As well as the normal 13 seats being contested, an extra seat was up for election in Aldenham East after the councillor Nigel Gilmore stepped down. Other councillors standing down included 2 from Labour, Joe Goldberg and Len Silverstone, and Conservatives Ron Gealy and Zita Hobbs. 9 of the 14 seats were being defended by the Conservatives, 3 by Labour and 2 by the Liberal Democrats.

Election result
The Conservatives increased their majority to 17 after gaining 2 seats from Labour. This reduced Labour to 5 councillors, behind the Liberal Democrats who stayed on 6 after retaining their 2 seats in Bushey. The Conservatives gains came in Borehamwood Brookmeadow, which they took by 103 votes, and Borehamwood Kenilworth, where Labour lost by 12 votes after several recounts. This meant Labour only won 1 seat in Borehamwood Cowley Hill, where they held on by an 86 vote majority.

The Labour group leader Leon Reefe said the reason for the defeats for the party was that "Labour voters are still disenchanted with what's going on nationally", while the Conservative council leader said "obviously national events had a bearing but I still feel that locally we are providing good services".

Ward results

References

2006 English local elections
2006
2000s in Hertfordshire